Kálmán Kalocsay (6 October 1891 in Abaújszántó – 27 February 1976) was a Hungarian Esperantist poet, translator and editor who considerably influenced Esperanto culture, both in its literature and in the language itself, through his original poetry and his translations of literary works from his native Hungarian and other languages of Europe. His name is sometimes Esperantized as Kolomano Kaloĉajo, and some of his work was published under various pseudonyms, including C.E.R. Bumy, Kopar, Alex Kay, K. Stelov, Malice Pik and Peter Peneter.

Kalocsay studied medicine and later became a surgeon and the chief infectious disease specialist at a major Budapest hospital. He learned both Esperanto and its breakaway dialect Ido in his adolescence but became more inclined towards Esperanto after he had seen its greater literary potential. In 1921 his first original collection of poems, Mondo kaj Koro (“World and heart”) was published. A further decade passed before the appearance of his collection Streĉita Kordo (“A taut string”), which many Esperantists consider as one of the finest collections of original Esperanto poetry, and Rimportretoj (“Portraits in rhyme”), witty poems in rondel style about various people then prominent in the Esperanto movement. In 1932, under the pseudonym Peter Peneter, he published Sekretaj Sonetoj (“Secret sonnets”), a book of erotic verse.

Kalocsay guided the Esperanto literary world through the magazine and publishing house called Literaturo Mondo (“Literary world”). A group of writers who coalesced around this magazine during the 1920s and 1930s was known as the Budapeŝto skolo (“Budapest school”).

Works of Kalocsay about literary and linguistic theory include the expansive Plena Gramatiko de Esperanto (“Complete grammar of Esperanto”) and Parnasa Gvidlibro (“Handbook of Parnassus”), a work on Esperanto poetics co-authored with Gaston Waringhien, and an academic style guide for Esperanto, Lingvo – Stilo – Formo (“Language, style and form”). Kalocsay also co-compiled the two-volume Enciklopedio de Esperanto (“Encyclopædia of Esperanto”).

Much was written about Kalocsay by his literary executor Ada Csiszár, after whose death the estate passed to the Esperanto museum of the Austrian National Library.

See also

 Julio Baghy

Further reading
 In Memoriam Kalocsay Kálmán Csiszár Ada, Budapest, 1994 (in Hungarian)
 Omaĝe al Kálmán Kalocsay 1 – 9 kötet, Csiszár Ada, Budapest, 1998 – 2006 (in Esperanto)

External links 

 
 
 Kalman Kalocsay's poetry in English at Poems Found in Translation

Hungarian Esperantists
Hungarian male poets
Writers of Esperanto literature
1891 births
1976 deaths
20th-century Hungarian poets
20th-century Hungarian male writers
People from Abaújszántó